Fiona Sarah Wade (born 20 March 1979) is an English actress, known for playing Priya Sharma in Emmerdale from 2011 to 2023.

Career
In 2008, Wade played Mamta in a play called Alaska by DC Moore at the Royal Court Jerwood Theatre Upstairs. Since 2011, Wade has played Priya Sharma in the ITV soap opera Emmerdale. Her first appearance was in November 2011. In January 2017, Wade took part in the primetime ITV entertainment series Dance Dance Dance. In October 2022, it was announced that Wade was set to leave Emmerdale after 11 years.

Personal life
Wade's mother is Filipina and her father is English. She married fellow actor and former Emmerdale co-star Simon Cotton in 2019. She is a follower of the Baháʼí Faith.

Filmography

Awards and nominations

References

External links
 
 

Living people
1979 births
20th-century Bahá'ís
21st-century Bahá'ís
British actresses of Asian descent
British Bahá'ís
English child actresses
English musical theatre actresses
English people of Filipino descent
English Shakespearean actresses
English soap opera actresses
English stage actresses
English television actresses
People from Enfield, London